Arshad Mehmood is a Pakistani actor, music composer, and a singer.

Early life and career
He had started composing music for Pakistan Television Corporation back in 1972.

EMI Pakistan period
He later was the driving force behind EMI Pakistan. EMI provided the platform for Pakistan's biggest music artists during the 1970s and later decades. Arshad Mehmood served there as a music producer and a talent promoter. His role at EMI was so crucial that noted Pakistani music director Nisar Bazmi reportedly commented, "EMI Pakistan without Arshad would be a nonentity".

Pakistan television period
Pakistan Television Corporation, all through most of his active career, used to ask him to produce and compose music for it. During that long period, he worked with many prominent Pakistani singers like Nayyara Noor, Tina Sani, Tahira Syed, Noor Jehan, Mehdi Hassan, Reshma, Mehnaz Begum, A. Nayyar and Alamgir.

He had acting roles in Pakistani TV drama serials such as Aangan Terha and Dhoop Kinare, Khamosh Pani (Silent Waters) (2003) and the music composition of ghazals from the poetry of Faiz Ahmed Faiz. He knew Faiz Ahmad Faiz and learned a lot from him, important things like patience, rationalizing one's problems and being cheerful even in the face of adversity.

In recent years, he has been teaching music at National Academy of Performing Arts (Pakistan) (NAPA) in Karachi, Pakistan. In 2019, he was serving as director programmes and administration at NAPA.

Awards and recognition
 Pride of Performance Award by the President of Pakistan in 2006 for his contributions in the field of Arts and Entertainment.

Filmography

as actor
 Khamosh Pani (Silent Waters) (2003)
 Ho Mann Jahaan (2016)
 Mehrunisa V Lub U (2017)
 Allahyar and the Legend of Markhor (2018)

Television

as actor
 Such Gup - satirical sketch show (PTV)
 Fifty Fifty - 1980s
 Ankahi PTV (1982)
 Aangan Terha PTV (1984)
 Dhoop Kinare PTV (1987)

As a composer
 Akkar Bakkar Bambay Bo (PTV) (1970s)
 Such Gup (PTV) (1975)
 Nestlé Nido Young Stars
 Ankahi (1982)

See also
Nayyara Noor
Faiz Ahmed Faiz

References

External links

A Man of Many Seasons

Living people
Year of birth missing (living people)
Pakistani male singers
Pakistani musicians
Pakistani composers
Pakistani music critics
Pakistani male television actors
Recipients of the Pride of Performance